The France women's national under-20 volleyball team represents France in international women's volleyball competitions and friendly matches under the age 20 and it is ruled by the French Volleyball Federation That is an affiliate of Federation of International Volleyball FIVB and also a part of European Volleyball Confederation CEV.

Results

FIVB U20 World Championship
 Champions   Runners up   Third place   Fourth place

Europe U19 Championship
 Champions   Runners up   Third place   Fourth place

Team

Current squad
The Following players is the French players that Competed in the 2018 Women's U19 Volleyball European Championship

References

External links
 French Volleyball Federation 

Volleyball
National women's under-20 volleyball teams
Volleyball in France